Jeju (Jeju: , ; ,  or), often called Jejueo or Jejuan in English-language scholarship, is a Koreanic language traditionally spoken on Jeju Island, South Korea. While often classified as a divergent Jeju dialect of the Korean language, the variety is referred to as a language in local government and increasingly in both South Korean and foreign academia. Jeju is not mutually intelligible with mainland Korean dialects.

The consonants of Jeju are similar to those of Seoul Korean, but Jeju has a larger and more conservative vowel inventory. Jeju is a head-final, agglutinative, suffixing language like Korean. Nouns are followed by particles that may function as case markers. Verbs inflect for tense, aspect, mood, evidentiality, relative social status, formality, and other grammatical information. Korean and Jeju differ significantly in their verbal paradigms. For instance, the continuative aspect marker of Jeju and the mood or aspect distinction of many Jeju connective suffixes are absent in Korean. Most of the Jeju lexicon is Koreanic, and the language preserves many Middle Korean words now lost in Standard Korean. Jeju may also have a Peninsular Japonic substratum, but this argument has been disputed by Lee (2017).

Jeju was already divergent from Seoul Korean by the fifteenth century, and was unintelligible to mainland Korean visitors by the sixteenth century. The language was severely undermined by the Jeju uprising of 1948, the Korean War, and the modernization of South Korea. All fluent speakers remaining in Jeju Island are now over seventy years old. Most people in Jeju Island now speak a variety of Korean with a Jeju substratum. The language may be somewhat more vigorous in a diaspora community in Osaka, Japan, as many Jeju people migrated to Osaka in the 1920s, but even there, younger members of the community speak Japanese. Since 2010, UNESCO has designated the language as critically endangered, the highest level of language endangerment possible. Revitalization efforts are ongoing.

Nomenclature and relationship to Korean 

Jeju is closely related to Korean. It was traditionally considered an unusually divergent dialect of Korean, and is still referred to as such by the National Institute of the Korean Language and the South Korean Ministry of Education. While the term "Jeju language" was first used in 1947, it was not until the mid-1990s that the term gained currency in South Korean academia. While "Jeju dialect" was still the preferred usage throughout the decade of the 2000s, the majority of South Korean academic publications had switched to the term "Jeju language" by the early 2010s. Since somewhat earlier, "Jeju language" has also been the term preferred in local law, such as the 2007 Language Act for the Preservation and Promotion of the Jeju Language, and by non-governmental organizations working to preserve the language. The only English-language monograph on Jeju, published in 2019, consistently refers to it as a language as well. Among native speakers, the term Jeju-mal "Jeju speech" is most common.

Jeju is not mutually intelligible with even the southernmost dialects of mainland Modern Korean. In a 2014 test for intelligibility, Korean speakers from three different dialect zones (Seoul, Busan, and Yeosu) were exposed to one minute of spoken Jeju, with a control group of native Jeju speakers. On average, Korean native speakers from all three dialect zones answered less than 10% of the basic comprehension questions correctly, while native Jeju speakers answered over 89% of the questions correctly. These results are comparable to the results of an intelligibility test of Norwegian for native Dutch speakers. Diaspora Jeju speakers living in Japan also report that they find it difficult to understand South Korean news media, and resort to Japanese subtitles when watching South Korean TV shows.

Geographic distribution 

Jeju was traditionally spoken throughout Jeju Province except in the Chuja Islands, halfway between Jeju Island and mainland Korea, where a variety of Southwestern Korean is found. The language is also used by some of the first- and second-generation members of the Zainichi Korean community in Ikuno-ku, Osaka, Japan.

Compared to mainland Korean dialect groups, there is little internal variation within Jeju. A distinction between a northern and southern dialect with a geographic divide at Hallasan is sometimes posited, but an eastern-western dialectal divide cutting through Jeju City and Seogwipo may better explain the few dialectal differences that do exist. A 2010 survey of regional variation in 305 word sets suggests that the north–south divide and the east–west divide coexist, resulting in four distinct dialect groups.

History and decline 

The Koreanic languages are likely not native to Jeju Island; it has been proposed that the family has its roots in Manchuria, a historical region in northeastern Asia. It is thought that Koreanic speakers migrated from southern Manchuria between the third and eighth centuries CE. Linguist Alexander Vovin suggests that the ancient kingdom of Tamna, which ruled the island until the twelfth century, may have spoken a Japonic language that left a substrate influence on Jeju. When exactly this putative Japonic language may have been replaced by the Koreanic ancestor of Jeju remains unclear.

Unlike mainland Korea, which was ruled only indirectly by the Mongols, Jeju was placed under direct Yuan administration in the late thirteenth century. Significant numbers of Mongol soldiers migrated to the island during this period, and their language acted as a superstratum that may have accelerated local language change. Linguist Yang Changyong speculates that the formation of Jeju as a language independent of Korean was influenced by Mongol. By the fifteenth century, when the invention of Hangul permits a detailed understanding of Korean phonology for the first time, Seoul Korean and Jeju were already divergent; the Seoul prestige dialect of fifteenth-century Middle Korean disallowed the diphthong , but Jeju does not.

Sixteenth- and seventeenth-century references to the language of Jeju by mainland Korean literati state that it was already unintelligible to mainland Koreans. Kim Sang-heon (1570―1652), who served as pacification commissioner on the island from 1601 to 1602, gives six words in the "provincial language" with clear cognates in modern Jeju and also writes:

"The exiled man Shin Jangnyeong was originally a government interpreter. He said, 'The language of this island is most like Chinese, and the sounds they make while driving cattle and horses are yet more impossible to tell apart. Is this because the climate is not far from that of China, or because the Yuan dynasty once ruled and appointed officials here and the Chinese mingled with them?'... What is called the provincial language is but high and thin and cannot be understood."

In 1629, the Korean government banned the emigration of Jeju Islanders to the mainland, further restricting linguistic contacts between Jeju and Korean. At the same time, the island was also used throughout the Joseon era (1392―1910) as a place of exile for disgraced scholar-officials. These highly educated speakers of Seoul Korean often tutored the children of their Jeju neighbors during their exile and established a continuous and significant Seoul Korean superstratum in Jeju.

Jeju remained the dominant language of both private and public spheres under Japanese colonial rule (1910―1945), although many Japanese loanwords entered the lexicon, and many speakers were monolingual. Large-scale migration of Jeju people to Japan began in 1911, and 38,000 Jeju Islanders lived in Osaka alone by 1934. Immigration to Japan continued even after Korean independence into the 1980s. Jeju is still spoken by older members of these diaspora communities, although younger individuals speak Japanese as their native language and are not fluent in Jeju.

Severe disruption to the Jeju language community began after the end of Japanese rule in 1945. Following World War II, Korea was divided between an American-backed government in the South and a Soviet-backed government in the North. Popular opposition to the division of Korea and police brutality led to a rebellion against the American military government on 3 April 1948. The Syngman Rhee regime, which succeeded the American administration in August 1948, suppressed the rebellion with mass killings of civilians. As many as sixty thousand Jeju Islanders, or a full fifth of the pre-rebellion population, were killed. Forty thousand more fled to Japan. Out of the four hundred villages of the island, only 170 remained. The devastating impact of the massacres on the Jeju language community was exacerbated by the outbreak of the Korean War in 1950. While Jeju was never occupied by the North Korean army, nearly 150,000 Korean-speaking refugees from the mainland fleeing North Korean invasion arrived in Jeju in the first year of the war. These events shattered the Jeju language's former dominance on the island, and Standard Korean was beginning to displace Jeju in the public sphere by the 1950s.

The decline of Jeju continued into the 1960s and 1970s. The Saemaeul Movement, an ambitious rural modernization program launched by Park Chung-hee, disrupted the traditional village community where Jeju had thrived. The language came to be perceived as an incorrect dialect of Korean, so that students were subject to corporal punishment if they used it in school, and the use of Standard Korean even in the private sphere began to spread from Jeju City outwards. The language attitude of native Jeju speakers in this period was self-disparaging, and even Jeju people regarded the use of Jeju "with contempt." A 1981 survey of language attitudes among high school and university students natively speaking Seoul Korean, Chungcheong Korean, Southwestern Korean, Southeastern Korean, and Jeju showed that Jeju speakers were the most likely among the five groups to ascribe negative traits to their native variety.

A 1992 study of code-switching by native Jeju speakers shows that Jeju was by then in an unfavorable diglossic relationship with Korean, and was largely restricted to informal contexts even between Jeju natives. Within a primarily Jeju-language conversation, speakers might spontaneously switch to Korean to emphasize the rationality or truth value of their statement, while switching to Jeju in a primarily Korean conversation signified that the speaker was making a subjective statement or being less serious.

The same study notes that by 1992, even this variety restricted to the informal domain was usually a Korean dialect with a Jeju substratum, rather than the traditional Jeju language:

"As for the Jeju language [] in general use nowadays [as of 1992], the situation is that its differences from Standard Korean are greatly diminishing compared to the past. Its greatest differences with Standard Korean [now] lie especially in the suffix paradigm, and in other areas the differences are being minimized. The Jeju people accordingly understand that Jeju and Standard Korean are in a form of dialect continuum, and refer to the native language formerly in use as "thick (or intense) Jeju language" and the Jeju language currently in use as "light Jeju language" or "mixed (with Korean) language."

Current status 

The official language of South Korea is Standard Korean. Nearly all residents of Jeju Island are bilingual in Standard Korean and Jeju, while many younger individuals are even more fluent in English than in Jeju. Standard Korean is most commonly used in the majority of public areas, while Jeju tends to be reserved for use at home and a few local markets. All schools located on Jeju Island are required to teach Standard Korean and only offer Jeju as an elective course. As a result, there are currently no monolingual speakers of Jeju.

As of 2018, fluent speakers in Jeju Island were all over seventy years of age, while passive competence was found in some people in their forties and fifties. Younger Islanders speak Korean with Jeju substrate influence found in residual elements of the Jeju verbal paradigm and in select vocabulary such as kinship terms. The language is more vigorous in Osaka, where there may be fluent speakers born as late as the 1960s. Since 2010, UNESCO has classified Jeju as a critically endangered language, defined as one whose "youngest speakers are grandparents and older... [who] speak the language partially and infrequently."

A 2008 survey of adult residents' knowledge of ninety Jeju cultural words showed that only twenty-one were understood by the majority of those surveyed. Lack of heritage knowledge of Jeju is even more severe among younger people. Four hundred Jeju teenagers were surveyed for their knowledge of 120 basic Jeju vocabulary items in 2010, but only nineteen words were recognized by the majority while forty-five words were understood by less than 10%. A 2018 study suggests that even the verbal paradigm, among the more resilient parts of the substratum, may be in danger; the average middle schooler was more competent in the verb system of English, a language "taught only a few hours a week in school and in private tutoring institutions," than of Jeju.

Revitalization efforts have recently been ongoing. On 27 September 2007, the Jeju provincial government promulgated the Language Act for the Preservation and Promotion of the Jeju Language, which established five-year plans for state-backed language preservation.The Act encouraged public schools on Jeju Island to offer Jeju as an extracurricular activity, as well as to incorporate the language as a part of regular classes if relevant and feasible. In addition, multiple programs were provided for adults, as well. For example, adult language programs are offered every year at the Jeju National University and are all completely free of charge. There are also several local centres on Jeju Island that offer classes in Jeju Language specifically to marriage-based immigrants. However, it was not until UNESCO's 2010 designation of Jeju as critically endangered that the provincial government became proactive in Jeju preservation efforts. In 2016, the provincial government allotted ₩685,000,000 (US$565,592 in 2016) to revitalization programs, and the government-funded Jeju Research Institute has compiled phrasebooks of the language. The provincial Ministry of Education has also published Jeju textbooks for elementary and secondary schools, although some textbooks really teach Standard Korean interspersed with Jeju lexical items. Some public schools offer after-school programs for Jeju, but the short duration of these classes may be insufficient to promote more than "symbolic" use by students. The linguistic competence of many teachers has also been challenged.

On 12 August 2011, the Research Centre for Jeju Studies was opened with the purpose of implementing projects for the revitalization and safeguarding of Jeju Language. The centre has implemented multiple projects and initiatives. The project encouraged the promotion of Jeju Language in schools by tasking the Education Bureau with introducing several revitalization initiatives, including a training program for teachers. The project also started a radio broadcast in Jeju Language, as well as a radio campaign for Jeju slang and an annual Jeju Language festival. An iPhone application was developed, including a glossary, as well as a collection of proverbs, poems, and quizzes in Jeju Language. Finally, an introductory conversation brochure was distributed to both citizens and visitors of Jeju Island in order to encourage the use of the language.

Other preservation and revitalization efforts are led by non-state bodies. The Jeju Language Preservation Society, founded in December 2008, publishes Deongdeureong-makke, a bimonthly Jeju-language magazine, and holds Jeju teaching programs and speaking contests. Literature in the language has recently been published, including children's books and a 2014 poetry anthology. Local bands and theater troupes have made Jeju-language performances. Regional newspapers such as the Jemin Ilbo and the Halla Ilbo include Jeju-language sections, and local branches of KBS and MBC have launched radio programs and a television series in Jeju. Recent South Korean media with nationwide appeal, including the 2010 television series Life is Beautiful and The Great Merchant, the 2012 drama film Jiseul, and the 2015 television series Warm and Cozy, have also featured spoken Jeju. Outside of Korea, in 2018, the Endangered Languages Archive at SOAS University of London carried out a revitalization project aimed to build a collection of audio and video recordings of Jeju Language being spoken by native speakers. These recordings documented everyday conversations, as well as traditional songs and rituals.

In the past, negative attitudes and opinions towards Jeju were popular amongst Korean citizens. The Standard Korean language places a lot of emphasis on honorifics, as Korean culture is largely centred around being polite to elders. However, Jeju is often viewed to be less polite, due to the use of less honorifics and only four levels of politeness, in comparison to the seven levels in Standard Korean. The younger generation, particularly students, especially believe that Jeju is not respectful enough to use with teachers, whereas Standard Korean is more sophisticated. In addition, Jeju is often associated with the countryside, as the majority of speakers tend to have traditional occupations, including farming, fishing, and diving. As a result, many younger children express a disinterest in learning the language.

However, recent surveys show changes favorable towards Jeju in prevailing language attitudes. In a National Institute of the Korean Language survey in 2005, only 9.4% of Jeju Islanders were very proud of the regional variety. When the same survey was reheld in 2015, 36.8% were very proud of the language, and Jeju Islanders had become the most likely among South Korean dialect groups to have "very positive" opinions of the regional variety. In a 2017 study of 240 Jeju Islanders, 82.8% of those sampled considered Jeju to be "nice to listen to," and 74.9% hoped that their children would learn the language. But significant generational cleavages in language attitudes were also found. For instance, only 13.8% of Jeju Islanders between twenty and forty liked Jeju much more than Standard Korean, which 49.1% of those above eighty did.

In a 2013 survey of Jeju natives, 77.9% agreed with the statement that "[the Jeju language] has to be passed down as part of Jeju culture." But a 2015 study of approximately a thousand Jeju Islanders suggests that even though most Jeju Islanders believe the language to be an important part of the island's culture, the vast majority are skeptical of the language's long-term viability, and more people are unwilling than willing to actively participate in language preservation efforts.

Orthography 

Jeju has historically had no written language. Two recently devised standard orthographies are currently in use: a system created in 1991 by scholars of the Jeju Dialect Research Society, and a system promulgated by the provincial government in 2014. Both systems use the Korean alphabet Hangul with one additional letter , which was used in the Middle and Early Modern Korean scripts but is now defunct in written Korean. Similar to the modern Korean script, Jeju orthographies have morphophonemic tendencies, meaning that transcribing the underlying morphology generally takes precedence over the surface form. The two orthographies differ largely because they are based on different morphological analyses of the language, especially of the verbal paradigm, as seen in the example below.

This article will use the government's orthography where the two differ.

The transliteration scheme generally used in Korean linguistics, including when transcribing Jeju, is the Yale Romanization system. This article also uses Revised Romanization with the addition of aw, but without Yang C., Yang S., and O'Grady 2019's one-to-one correspondence between Hangul glyphs and the Latin alphabet.

Phonology

Consonants 

The non-approximant consonants of Jeju correspond to the nineteen non-approximant consonants of Standard Korean, and Jeju displays the three-way contrast between stops and affricates characteristic of Modern Korean. Whether the voiced glottal fricative , absent in Standard Korean, exists as a phoneme in Jeju or merely as an allophone of  remains disputed. A 2000 acoustic and aerodynamic study of eight native Jeju speakers concludes that "the consonants of the two languages seem to be the same in every respect... the phonetic realization of all [Jeju] consonants are the same as those found in [Seoul] Korean."

Consonantal phonological processes 

Jeju allophony involves a number of phonological processes also found in Seoul Korean. As in Korean,  surfaces as  intervocally. Whether non-lax stops and affricates can appear in final position is controversial. The morphological analysis necessary for the government's orthography permits them, while the analysis behind the Jeju Language Research Society's orthography forbids them.

Lax obstruents are tensed following another obstruent.  aspirates both the preceding and the subsequent lax obstruent. On the other hand, underlying  and  both produce .

Jeju also has consonant allophones that appear only at morpheme boundaries. Other rules are absent in Standard Korean. For instance, a sonorant-final word or morpheme can trigger aspiration (for older speakers) or tensing (for younger speakers) in a subsequent lax consonant. In some cases this is due to an underlying consonant cluster, but not all cases can be explained in this way.

Verbal conjugation can also lead to consonantal changes.

Underlying consonant clusters 

While not permitted in the surface representation of Jeju, morpheme-final consonant clusters can exist in the underlying form. Many cases of post-sonorant aspiration involve morphemes whose Middle Korean cognates feature a final , suggesting that an underlying final  after the sonorant should be posited in Jeju as well. These clusters surface as a single consonant in isolation or before a consonant, but are fully realized when followed by a vowel.

Vowels 

Jeju traditionally has a nine-vowel system: the eight vowels of Korean with the addition of  ㆍ , a Middle Korean phoneme lost in Seoul in the eighteenth century.

The subsequent loss of  may have been motivated by a language-internal desire for symmetry in the vowel system. On the other hand, the vowel mergers are accelerated among Jeju speakers living in coastal communities more exposed to Standard Korean.

Vowel phonological processes 

Several phonological processes affect the surface realization of Jeju vowels. In one process shared with Standard Korean, a bisyllabic vowel sequence may be contracted to a monosyllabic polyphthong.

Vowel-affecting processes are particularly numerous in the verbal paradigm. Verb stem-final  is lost before a vowel-initial suffix. Similar to Standard Korean, a stem-final  diphthongizes a subsequent vowel by inserting the onglide .

Many of Jeju's consonant-initial verbal suffixes take an initial epenthetic vowel if the previous morpheme ends with a consonant.

Like Standard Korean but unlike Middle Korean, Koreanic vowel harmony is no longer generally applicable in all native morphemes but remains productive in sound symbolism and certain verbal suffixes. Jeju has two harmonic classes, yin and yang. The neutral vowel  can occur with either class.

For instance, the perfective aspect marker   takes the vowel harmonic allomorph   after verb stems whose (final) vowel is yang:

In certain cases, suffix allomorphs do not match the harmonic class of the previous vowel. Disyllabic stems that end in  also take the yang allomorph, but monosyllabic  stems or disyllabic  stems do not.

Phonotactics 

Jeju syllable structure is (C)(G)V(C) with G being a glide.

As in Standard Korean,   cannot occur syllable-initially, and   does not occur word-initially in native words.

Prosody 

Jeju does not have phonemic vowel length, stress, or tone. Its phonological hierarchy is characterized by accentual phrases similar to those of Standard Korean, with a basic Low-High-Low-High tonal pattern varying according to sentence type, but there are also important differences in the two languages' prosody. Jeju has a weaker tonal distinction within the first half of the accentual phrase than Seoul Korean does, while its aspirate consonants do not produce as significant a high pitch as their Seoul equivalents. Jeju uses more contour tones, where the pitch shifts within a single syllable, than Seoul Korean. Unlike in Seoul Korean,  older and fluent speakers of Jeju will also lengthen the final vowel of both clauses in alternative questions.

Grammar 

ORD: ordinal numeral
INTR: interrogative
MED: medial demonstrative
SE: sentence ender
CE: canonical ending
REP : reportive
NPST: nonpast

Jeju is typologically similar to Korean, both being head-final agglutinative languages. However, the two languages show significant differences in the verbal paradigm, such as Jeju's use of a dedicated conditional suffix.

Nouns 

Jeju nouns may be a single morpheme, a compound of multiple nouns, or a base noun with a merged attributive verb, or form through derivational affixes attached to nouns or verb stems. In compound nouns that include a native morpheme, the phoneme  may intervene between the two elements.

 Single-morpheme noun:   "cattle"
 Noun compound:

 Noun compound with :

 Noun with merged attributive verb:

 Noun derived from noun through affix:

 Noun derived from verb through affix:

 Verbal noun:

(Examples from Yang C., Yang S, and O'Grady 2019 and Ko J. 2011a)

Some Jeju nouns are bound nouns, meaning that they cannot appear independently without a noun phrase. The example below features the bound noun   "worth" accompanied by the obligatory attributive verb.

Jeju has two suffixing plural markers, which are obligatory for plural nouns accompanied by determiners and optional otherwise. The plural marker   can occur with all nouns and pronouns. The marker   is restricted for humans and pronouns, and can also have an associative meaning: e.g.   "Mansu and his family". The combined sequence   is sometimes also used.

Classifiers for cardinals are unmarked, but those for ordinals are followed by the ordinal-marking  .

Noun particles 

Jeju marks noun case and other semantic relations through suffixing noun particles. Particles that mark the nominative, accusative, and genitive cases are very frequently omitted. The table below is not exhaustive and lists only some of the most significant particles.

Verbs 

The Jeju verb consists of a root that is followed by suffixes that provide grammatical information such as voice, tense, aspect, mood, evidentiality, relative social status, and the formality of the utterance. Jeju verbs include not only action verbs familiar to English speakers such as   "to eat" or   "to see," but also adjectival verbs such as   "to be heavy" or   "to be thick." Verbs can take derivational suffixes to form adverbs and nouns.

   "to be close" →    "closely"
   "to be bad" →    "badness"
   "to wear" →    "wearing"

Especially for wh-questions and exclamations, Jeju speakers commonly use a verbal noun in place of a verb inflected for tense-aspect-mood.

Verbs may also be given an attributive meaning through one of four adnominal suffixes.

 Adnominal suffix  : Past event for action verbs, achieved state for adjectival verbs

 Adnominal suffix  : Habitual action in the past

 Adnominal suffix  : Nonpast/present event or state, commonly habitual; cannot occur with other suffixes and must combine directly with the bare verb stem; can occur with adjectival verbs, unlike in Korean

 Adnominal suffix  : Future/conjectural event or state

Pre-final suffixes 

Jeju has a number of pre-final verbal suffixes: tense-aspect-mood markers which follow the verb stem but cannot appear at the end of the inflected verb. The exact number of these suffixes is unclear because scholars disagree on the correct morphological segmentation. One analysis of the suffix paradigm, as presented in Yang C., Yang S., and O'Grady 2019, is given below.

There is relatively widespread agreement on the existence of the following four discrete TAM morphemes, presented in the order they co-occur: the continuative aspect marker  , the perfective aspect marker  , the prospective mood marker  , and the realis mood marker  .

 is an imperfective or continuative aspect particle, referring to a process perceived as ongoing and similar to the English construction "be VERB-ing." With an adjectival verb, it has an inchoative ("beginning to; become") meaning.

Often characterized as a perfective aspect marker,  has also been described as a present perfect marker and as behaving as a perfective marker with some verbs and as a past tense marker with others.  can express non-past events in certain constructions that call for verbs "conceptualized in their entirety," such as a hypothetical future event. In adjectival verbs, it may also refer to a current state that contrasts with a past situation.  can also be doubled for a habitual or a past perfect interpretation.

The prospective mood marker   marks the subject's intention in first-person-subject declarative sentences or second-person-subject interrogative sentences, and the speaker's conjecture otherwise.  may also have a future-tense interpretation.

 can only be followed by a small number of suffixes in Yang C., Yang S., and O'Grady 2019's analysis.

The realis or indicative mood marker   indicates "a fact or habitual action in the nonpast" which the speaker perceives to be true in general, permanently, or over a longer duration of time, as demonstrated in the contrast below. In this context, the morpheme  has also been interpreted as a perfect marker (not to be confused with the perfective marker).

The existence of the Korean subject-honorific marker   is controversial for Jeju, with some scholars arguing that it was entirely absent and others that it was restricted to higher registers. Ko J. 2011b notes that it was used only "by officials while referring to people of very high status and by the seonbi of the educated classes."

Segmenting verb-final suffixes 

The segmentation of verb-final elements is controversial. The two recent extensive treatments of the topic, Yang C., Yang S., and O'Grady 2019 and Kim Jee-hong 2015, give incompatible analyses of the suffix paradigm.

Yang C., Yang S., and O'Grady 2019 includes a slot for tense in the Jeju verb, with three dedicated markers.

 Non-past tense:  
 Past tense:  , with vowel-harmonic allomorph  
 Future tense:  

They further divide verb-final suffixes into three categories: Type 1, which cannot occur with tense markers; Type 2, which must occur with either a tense marker or the aspect marker , which loses its underlying  before a Type 2 suffix; and a mixed type, which can occur with the non-past marker but not with the other two tense markers. The vast majority of suffixes are categorized as Tense 1 and thus cannot follow a tense marker. Uniquely among pre-final suffixes, the past tense marker  can also appear without a final suffix.

Examples of Yang C., Yang S., and O'Grady 2019's segmentation are given below.

In Kim Jee-hong's analysis, verb-final single morphemes are termed "canonical endings." Canonical endings are contrasted with a wide variety of "non-canonical endings," formed by the fusion of various grammatical elements such as multiple canonical endings, truncated conjunctive and embedded sentences, and bound nouns connected to the verb stem or a canonical ending via an attributive or a nominalizer. The most common canonical component of these non-canonical endings is the suffix   (vowel-harmonic allomorph  ), which Kim calls the unmarked "default ending."

Since Yang C., Yang S., and O'Grady 2019's tenses align with the aforementioned attributive suffixes, sentences they analyze as "Tense-Type 2 Suffix" sequences are often analyzed as non-canonical endings with a "Canonical ending-Attributive-Bound noun" composition by Kim Jee-hong. Many of Yang C., Yang S., and O'Grady 2019's Type 1 suffixes are also interpreted as polymorphemic non-canonical endings.

Examples from Kim Jee-hong 2015's analysis, directly corresponding to the examples above of Yang C., Yang S., and O'Grady 2019, are given below. The "default ender"  is bolded.

Sentence enders 

Jeju has a number of clause-final suffixes, called "sentence enders" in Yang C., Yang S., and O'Grady 2019 and "terminal suffixes" in Korean, that provide information such as degree of formality, social status, evidentality, and modality. Sentence enders may consist of one or multiple morphemes. Kim Jee-hong argues for four speech levels in Jeju, defined by the degree of formality and deference their sentence enders connote: informal and plain (non-honorific); formal and plain; informal and honorific, marked by the morpheme  , and formal and honorific, featuring the morpheme  . An archaic speech level showing extreme deference is attested from shamanic chants.

As different segmentation hypotheses produce different sentence enders. the chart below will list only a small, illustrative sample of the dozens of suffixes that appear in Yang C., Yang S., and O'Grady 2019 and Kim Jee-h. 2015. The classification is based on Kim Jee-hong 2017, which differs from Kim Jee-hong 2015.
                                            

The honorific verbs, which show deference to the addressee, are formed by a special suffix that can be followed only by a small number of sentence enders.

The former is used with the copula verb   and with all inflected verbs, and the latter is used with uninflected adjectival verbs.  and  may take the alternative form   after a verb inflected for aspect and a non-liquid consonant, respectively. The informal honorific form cannot occur with uninflected action verbs. The two suffixes may only be followed by the sentence enders in the table below. Informal honorific requests cannot be formed morphologically.

The formal honorific forms involve the honorific marker   followed by one or two morphemes. Only the six following formal honorific forms are possible.

Connectives 

Jeju uses an array of verb-final connective suffixes to link clauses within sentences, much as English does with conjunctions such as and, or, that, but, and because.

Hong suggests that  is used for specific and objective events and states, while  implies a general and subjective event or state. The nuances below are thus possible.

These fused suffixes may be used for both quotative and reportive purposes. In Standard Korean, indirect speech is strictly distinguished from the quotative by the removal of addressee honorifics and the switching of pronouns. In Jeju, the lines between direct and indirect speech are more blurred. All four forms below—given in order of increasing indirectness—are in use, and have the same meaning, "He said [to a superior] that he was going home."

Other connectives include   "if";   "because"; and   "after".

Auxiliary and light verbs 

Jeju has many auxiliary verbs that are linked to the preceding main verb by the morpheme  . These include   "to give," for an action that benefits a superior;   "to throw away," for an action yielding a complete result; and   "to become," for a change of state.  is also used to indicate ability.

Jeju also uses light verbs, which have little semantic meaning but combine with nouns to form verbs. The most common light verb is   "to do," e.g.   "errand" →   "to run an errand". There is also a large inventory of periphrastic phrases that convey modality.

Post-phrasal particles 

Jeju has a small group of particles that commonly occur at the very end of phrases or sentences, many of which play important roles as discourse markers.

 (variants) may occur after subsentential phrases such as a bare or case-inflected noun, or attach to a small number of mostly plain sentence enders. The particle shows the speaker's deference towards the addressee, but is considered more emotionally intimate than the verbally inflected honorifics. In certain contexts,  may be used with an intention to snub the addressee.

 is a discourse marker that attaches to adverbs, nouns and noun particles, and both sentence enders and connectives. Both cannot be used while addressing a social superior, and  also cannot appear in formal speech. Both particles can also appear in isolation:  as a strong affirmation to a question,  as an indication that the speaker has not heard or does not believe what has been said.

At the end of a sentence, it emphasizes the speaker's beliefs or attitudes. For example, a question becomes a rhetorical one when  is attached:   "Could there be?" →   "How could there be?" The particle is also commonly used for sarcastic mock deference, such as by parents while scolding children. Sentence-initially or internally, the suffix may establish the preceding element as the topic of discourse.  is also used in isolation as an interjection to get the attention of unfamiliar individuals, such as a shopkeeper, or to request the addressee to repeat what they have just said.

In the example below from Yang C. 2009, three of the four particles discussed above are used.

Note the granddaughter's use of the verbally inflected honorific  and the deference-marking  and  while addressing the grandmother.

Pronouns and deixis 

Jeju has the following basic personal pronouns.

According to Yang C., Yang S., and O'Grady 2019, there are four basic deictic demonstratives in Jeju. Most other sources mention three, which are identical to those of Standard Korean.

 Proximal:   "this"
 Medial or absent:   "that"
 Distal:   "that"

Vocabulary 

Most of the Jeju lexicon is Koreanic, and "a sizeable number" of words are identical with Korean. There are false friends between the languages, such as Korean   "to wash hair" and Jeju   "to wash the body." Jeju also preserves many Middle Korean terms now lost in Korean, such as   "wife; woman" and   "parent." Like Korean, Jeju uses many Sino-Korean words based on local readings of Classical Chinese.

Jeju Island was ruled by the Mongols in the late thirteenth century and some Middle Mongol terms still survive in the language, though the extent of Mongol influence is disputed. Popular claims of hundreds of Mongol loans in Jeju are linguistically unsound. Uncontroversial Mongol loans are most common in terms relating to animal husbandry.

Jeju may have loans from an ancient Japonic substratum. As the last fluent generation of Jeju speakers were born under or shortly after Japanese rule, remaining speakers also use many loans from Modern Japanese.

Sound symbolism 

Jeju has widespread sound symbolism in ideophones. The use of sound symbolism to form emphatic variants of words is more common in Jeju than in Seoul Korean.

Jeju sound symbolism operates with both consonants and vowels. The intensity of a Jeju word may be strengthened by using tense and especially aspirate obstruents. The sound symbolism may also be emphasized through the addition of consonants, by adding the sequence   to both reduplicated segments, and with fortition or lenition. The yang harmonic class of vowels has a bright, small connotation, and the yin vowel class gives a dark, large connotation. Ko Jae-hwan also gives examples of three or four layers of vowel sound symbolism.

 Consonant sound symbolism:
   "savory" →   "[very] savory" →   "[extremely] savory"
   "[small] sound of rat gnawing teeth" →   "[large] sound of rat gnawing teeth"
   "easily angered" →   "[very] easily angered" 
   "neatly aligned" →   "[very] neatly aligned"
 Vowel sound symbolism:
   "round [of a small object]" →   "round [of a large object]"
   "[small and light] sound of muttered complaints" →   "[large and heavy] sound of muttered complaints" →   "[very large and very heavy] sound of muttered complaints"
   "smooth to the touch [of a very small or dry object]" →   "smooth to the touch [of a somewhat small or dry object]" →   "slippery to the touch [of a somewhat large or wet object]" →   "slippery to the touch [of a very large or wet object]"

Multiple sound-symbolic strategies may combine in a single word. Kang S. 2008 gives eight sound symbolic variants of the ideophone   "the shape of many objects being blunt," each more intense than the other:

  →   →   →   →   →    →   →

Kinship terminology 

The kinship terminology of Jeju has been the focus of particular attention. Jeju has a complex kinship system that distinguishes the gender of both the speaker and the relative. Gender distinctions are particularly noticeable in sibling terminology. The words   and   refer to "older same-gender sibling" and "younger same-gender sibling" respectively, while   and   refer specifically to "brother of a female" and "sister of a male" respectively. Female speakers also tend to refer to relatives with native compounds, whereas male speakers prefer Sino-Korean terms. For instance, the same cousin may be referred to by a man as   "cousin" but by a woman as   "paternal aunt's daughter." A major distinction between Jeju and Korean kinship terms is that women do not use honorifics to refer to their in-laws, reflecting weaker historical influence from Confucian patriarchal norms.

Jeju also uses supplementary prefixes to clarify the type of kinship, equivalent to "step-" or "maternal" in English. Five other prefixes, which may be combined, mark relative age:   or   "eldest,"   "second eldest of three or more,"   "third eldest of four or more," and   "youngest." These are used to distinguish relatives of the same generation.

   "grandfather"
   "oldest brother of one's grandfather"
   "second brother of one's grandfather"
   "third brother of one's grandfather"
   "fourth brother of one's grandfather"
   "fifth brother of one's grandfather"
   "youngest brother of one's grandfather"

Sample text 

The following is an excerpt from a version of the Menggam bon-puri, one of the epic chants recited by Jeju shamans. In this myth, the poacher Song Saman discovers an abandoned skull in the hills and cares for it as if it were his own ancestor. The skull reciprocates by warning Song Saman of his early death and advising him on how to avoid the chasa, the three gods of death.

This version was transcribed between 1956 and 1963 from the recitation of the shaman Byeon Sin-saeng, born  1904. The transcription predates both standardized orthographies of Jeju. The transcriber openly notes that the orthography is inconsistent. No attempt was made in this article to standardize or update the orthography.

See also 

 Bon-puri, Jeju-language narrative poems explaining the origins of deities.

References

Citations

Bibliography

English

Korean

External links 

 jejueo.com: The official Korean-language website of the Jeju Language Preservation Society, the leading language revival organization.
 Jejueo: The Language of Jeju Island: An English-language website maintained by Yang Changyong, Yang Sejung, and William O'Grady, authors of the only English-language monograph on the language. The site includes an audio sample (found in the section "Jejueo Intelligibility Test") and a short Jeju-English dictionary.
 "A multi-modal documentation of Jejuan conversations": An annotated audio-video corpus of spoken Jeju, maintained by the Endangered Languages Archive at SOAS University of London
 Jejuan DoReCo corpus compiled by Soung-U Kim. Audio recordings of narrative texts with transcriptions time-aligned at the phone level, translations, and time-aligned morphological annotations.

Agglutinative languages
Critically endangered languages
Culture in Jeju Province
Languages of South Korea
Koreanic languages
Korean dialects
Subject–object–verb languages